Enterprise architecture artifacts, or EA artifacts, are separate documents constituting enterprise architecture. EA artifacts provide descriptions of an organization from different perspectives important for the various actors involved in strategic decision-making and implementation of IT systems. They can be considered as key elements and cornerstones of an EA practice. Essentially, an EA practice revolves around using specific sets of EA artifacts for improving communication between different actors.

Overview 
EA artifacts are main instruments of an EA practice enabling effective decision-making and IT planning in organizations. The systematic use of EA artifacts for collective decision-making distinguishes a disciplined approach to information systems planning from an ad hoc and ill-organized one.
Different EA artifacts are used by different actors at different moments for different purposes and fulfill different roles in organizations. EA artifacts can be very diverse in their basic properties and attributes. From the perspective of their properties all EA artifacts can differ in their informational contents, general meanings and lifecycles in the context of an EA practice.

Informational contents 
From the perspective of their informational contents, various EA artifacts can use different representation formats, provide different levels of detail, cover different scopes, describe different EA domains and focus on different points in time:
 EA artifacts can have different representation formats. Specifically, EA artifacts can be represented in textual, graphical and sometimes tabular formats, or as a mix of these formats. Purely textual EA artifacts contain only plain text. Purely graphical EA artifacts contain only diagrams and models sometimes created using special modeling languages or notations. Purely tabular EA artifacts contain only tables with rows and columns. Mixed EA artifacts can contain the elements of all these representation formats in different proportions
 EA artifacts can provide different levels of detail. Descriptions contained in EA artifacts can range in their granularity from very high-level abstractions (e.g. business or IT capabilities, overarching rules, executive-level considerations, etc.) to pretty low-level details (e.g. specific business activities, IT systems, databases, etc.)
 EA artifacts can cover different organizational scopes. From the perspective of their scopes, coverage of EA artifacts ranges from entire organizations, lines of business and business functions to narrow organizational areas, specific change initiatives and even single IT projects. Typically EA artifacts covering wider scopes are less detailed, while EA artifacts covering narrower scopes are more detailed
 EA artifacts can describe different EA domains. EA domains often described by EA artifacts include business, applications, data, infrastructure and security domains, as well as all possible combinations of multiple different EA domains
 EA artifacts can focus on different temporal states of an organization, i.e. describe an organization at different points in time. All states typically described in EA artifacts can be roughly separated into the current state (now), short-term future state (<1 year), mid-term future state (2-3 years) and long-term future state (3-5 years). Additionally, some EA artifacts can describe a combination of all these states in different proportions or can even be essentially stateless, i.e. do not focus on specific points in time. For example, some EA artifacts can describe the current state of an organization as well as the planned changes to this state in both the short-term and mid-term future, while other EA artifacts can describe some timeless imperatives for an organization which were relevant in the past, are relevant now and will be relevant in the future

Lifecycles 
From the perspective of their lifecycles in an EA practice all EA artifacts can be separated into permanent EA artifacts and temporary EA artifacts:
 Permanent EA artifacts are long-lived EA artifacts often existing for many years. They “live” and evolve together with an organization. Permanent EA artifacts are created once and then updated when necessary according to the ongoing changes in an organization and its business environment. They may be either developed at once in a proactive manner, or produced reactively on an as-necessary basis, i.e. accumulated in organizations gradually over time. After being developed these EA artifacts are constantly used, continuously maintained and occasionally discarded when become irrelevant. Most EA artifacts covering wider scopes beyond specific IT initiatives or projects tend to be permanent EA artifacts
 Temporary EA artifacts are short-lived EA artifacts often existing for several months or even weeks. They are transitory, single-purposed and disposable. Temporary EA artifacts are created at specific moments for particular purposes, used as intended and then immediately discarded or archived. Due to their short lifespan, the very need to update or maintain temporary EA artifacts is usually absent. All EA artifacts covering narrow scopes, e.g. specific IT initiatives or projects, tend to be temporary EA artifacts

Meanings 
From the perspective of their general meaning in an EA practice all EA artifacts can be separated into decisions EA artifacts and facts EA artifacts:
 Decisions EA artifacts represent made planning decisions, i.e. achieved and formalized agreements between various stakeholders regarding the desired future course of action. Decisions EA artifacts always have certain implications for the future and usually imply specific changes in an organization. Since all planning decisions regarding the future require the discussion and consensus between their stakeholders, these EA artifacts are always developed or updated collaboratively by all relevant stakeholders and represented in formats convenient for these stakeholders. Decisions EA artifacts are inherently subjective, speculative and people-specific in nature. They are based only on informed opinions of their contributors regarding the desirable future course of action and shaped primarily by the key interests of their stakeholders. Essentially, decisions EA artifacts play the primary role in an EA practice by providing the instruments for effective communication, balanced decision-making and collaborative IT planning. Their general purpose is to help make optimal planning decisions approved by all relevant stakeholders. After decisions EA artifacts are created and approved, all their stakeholders should be ready to act according to the corresponding planning decisions reflected in these EA artifacts. Since any ideas regarding the desired future always imply collective decisions, all EA artifacts describing the future state, as well as all stateless EA artifacts also having specific implications for the future, can be automatically considered as decisions EA artifacts from the perspective of their general meaning in an EA practice
 Facts EA artifacts represent documented objective facts, i.e. reflections of the actual current situation in an organization as it is. Unlike decisions EA artifacts, facts EA artifacts do not imply any planning decisions and have no implications for the future. Since objective facts are normally not discussable and do not require any real decision-making, these EA artifacts may be developed or updated solely by specific actors, but represented in formats convenient for their future users. Facts EA artifacts are based only on acknowledged “hard” data and largely independent of specific people involved in their development. Essentially, facts EA artifacts play the supporting role in an EA practice by providing the information base required for developing decisions EA artifacts. Their general purpose is to help capture and store the objective facts regarding an organization important from the perspective of IT planning. After facts EA artifacts are created, they can be used by any actors as reference materials for planning purposes. Since a mere documentation of the current situation does not imply any real decisions, all EA artifacts describing only the current state can be automatically considered as facts EA artifacts from the perspective of their general meaning in an EA practice

Duality 
One of the most important properties of EA artifacts is the duality of their informational contents. Duality of EA artifacts implies that the information provided by these EA artifacts is relevant to two different audiences simultaneously, satisfies the information needs of both these audiences and presented in a convenient format appealing to both audiences. Their duality allows using EA artifacts as a means of communication and partnership between different groups of actors involved in strategic decision-making and implementation of IT systems. Duality of EA artifacts can be considered as one of the most fundamental mechanisms underpinning an EA practice and enabling effective collaboration between diverse stakeholders. Duality of EA artifacts can be explicit or implicit:
 Explicit duality is when different parts of EA artifacts are relevant to different groups of actors, e.g. some sections of an EA artifact are intended primarily for business stakeholders, while other sections of the same EA artifact are intended primarily for IT stakeholders
 Implicit duality is when same parts of EA artifacts are interpreted differently by different actors, e.g. the same diagram in an EA artifact is relevant to both business and IT stakeholders, but has significantly different implications for each of these parties
In other words, duality of EA artifacts implies either providing different information to different actors, or providing same information having different meanings for different actors. Explicit and implicit dualities in EA artifacts are often combined. However, not all useful EA artifacts are dual in nature.

See also 
 Enterprise architecture framework
 Origins of enterprise architecture

References

External links 
 Enterprise Architecture on a Page (June 2018)

Enterprise architecture